Justice Preston may refer to:

Byron W. Preston, associate justice of the Iowa Supreme Court
Edward Preston, justice of the Supreme Court of the Kingdom of Hawaii
Gilbert of Preston, chief justice of the Common Pleas in the United Kingdom
Isaac Trimble Preston, associate justice of the Louisiana Supreme Court
John W. Preston, associate justice of the Supreme Court of California